Andrea Adorante (born 5 February 2000) is an Italian professional footballer who plays as a forward for  club Triestina.

Club career 
Adorante started football at Parma Calcio, the club of his native town, before joining Inter Milan. There he was instrumental in Inter's several youth team achievements, but despite figuring several times on the bench with the first team, he never made his professional debut and was undermined by severe injuries.

After coming back to Parma on the summer 2019, Adorante made his professional debut for Parma on 5 December 2019, in a Coppa Italia game against Frosinone, starting in his side's 2–1 win.

Adorante made his Serie A debut on 28 September 2020, playing the last 10 minutes of a 4–1 win against Bologna. On 28 October 2020, he scored his first goal as a professional, Parma's third in a 3–1 cup win against Pescara.

On 23 January 2021, Adorante joined Serie C side Virtus Francavilla on loan for the remainder of the season. On 2 August 2021, he moved on loan to ACR Messina.

On 13 July 2022, Adorante signed a three-year contract with Triestina.

References

External links

2000 births
Living people
Sportspeople from Parma
Italian footballers
Association football forwards
Serie A players
Serie C players
Parma Calcio 1913 players
Virtus Francavilla Calcio players
A.C.R. Messina players
U.S. Triestina Calcio 1918 players
Italy youth international footballers
Footballers from Emilia-Romagna